Kevin Whitley (born February 26, 1970) is an American football coach and former cornerback who is an assistant coach at Georgia Southern University. For the 2021 season, he assumed the role of interim head coach. He was previously the cornerbacks coach at Georgia Southern, and was a longtime high school coach in Georgia. Whitley also played professionally in the Canadian Football League (CFL) for the Toronto Argonauts for three seasons.

Head coaching record

College

References

External links
 
 Georgia Southern profile

1970 births
Living people
American football cornerbacks
American players of Canadian football
Georgia Southern Eagles football coaches
Georgia Southern Eagles football players
New England Patriots players
Toronto Argonauts players
High school football coaches in Georgia (U.S. state)
People from DeKalb County, Georgia
Sportspeople from Greenville, North Carolina
Players of American football from Georgia (U.S. state)
Coaches of American football from Georgia (U.S. state)